Nikolas Dimitriou (born 22 April 2002) is a Cypriot professional footballer who plays as an attacking midfielder for Greek Super League 2 club AEK Athens B.

References

2002 births
Living people
Cypriot footballers
Super League Greece 2 players
AEK Athens F.C. B players
Association football midfielders
Sportspeople from Nicosia